Thetis is a small islet off the southern coast of the Greek island of Crete in the Libyan Sea. The islet is administered from Asterousia in Heraklion regional unit.

Landforms of Heraklion (regional unit)
Uninhabited islands of Crete
Islands of Greece